Marissa Otten (born 11 July 1989) is a Dutch former professional racing cyclist.
She retired in August 2015.

See also
 2014 Parkhotel Valkenburg Continental Team season

References

External links

1989 births
Living people
Dutch female cyclists
People from Wierden
Cyclists from Overijssel
21st-century Dutch women